Turpinia occidentalis, the muttonwood, is a species  of tree native to southern Mexico, the Caribbean islands, Central America and northern South America.

References

Staphyleaceae
Trees of Peru